New Edubease is one of the constituencies represented in the Parliament of Ghana. It elects one Member of Parliament (MP) by the first past the post system of election. New Edubease is located in the Adansi South district  of the Ashanti Region of Ghana.

Boundaries
The seat is located within the Adansi South District of the Ashanti Region of Ghana.

Members of Parliament

Elections
{| class="wikitable"
|+2016 Ghanaian general election : 
New Edubease
Source : Peacefmonline
!Party
!Candidate
!Votes
!%
|-
|NPP
|George Boahen Oduro
|18,477
|56.47
|-
|NDC
|Ernest Kofi Yakah
|14,050
|42.94
|-
|CPP
|Solomon Boadu
|191
|0.58
|}

See also
List of Ghana Parliament constituencies

References 

Parliamentary constituencies in the Ashanti Region